Zicklin is a surname. Notable people with the surname include:

Dottie Zicklin (born 1964), American television writer and producer
Eric Zicklin (born 1967), American television producer and writer
Larry Zicklin (born 1970), American economics writer